The 2012–13 season is the 63rd season in Raja CA's existence. Raja finished 4th in Botola last season and this season they will be looking for their 11th Botola title.

Squad

Matches

Botola Pro

Results

Botola

Raja top scorers
Last updated on 3 December 2011

References

Raja CA seasons